Huang Yi may refer to:
Huang Yi (Qing dynasty) (1744–1802), painter and seal carver
Huang Yi (author) (1952–2017), author of Wuxia novels
Huang Yi (actress) (born 1979), Chinese actress and singer
Huang Yi (politician) (born 1958), Chinese politician